June Burn (1893–1969) was an American writer and columnist.

Background and Career

Burn was born Inez Chandler Harris on June 19, 1893 in Anniston, Alabama.  Her father was a Methodist circuit riding minister.  At age sixteen, she moved to Oklahoma and eventually graduated from Oklahoma State University. Many years later, she completed her M.A. in Soil and Nutrition under William Albrecht at the University of Missouri.

In 1917, Harris started working as a staff writer for McCall's in New York City.  Two years later she met and married Farrar Burn (1888–1974), a recent World War I veteran, while living outside of Washington, D.C. Over the next fifty years, Farrar and June travelled extensively around the United States, homesteading in the San Juan Islands, teaching Eskimos and traveling across the United States in a covered wagon.  She wrote extensively for various periodicals and wrote several books.  Burn's autobiography Living High: An Unconventional Autobiography (1941) documents much of her early life story, particularly her time on Waldron Island and other islands in Washington's San Juan Islands. The book has been republished several times. June Burn died in 1969 and her husband Farrar died in 1974.  They were both buried in Van Buren, Arkansas. Burn's daughter-in-law, Doris Burn, was a notable children's book author and illustrator.

References

American magazine journalists
20th-century American memoirists
1893 births
1969 deaths
American women essayists
American women journalists
American women novelists
American women memoirists
Oklahoma State University alumni
University of Missouri alumni
People from Anniston, Alabama
Journalists from Alabama
Novelists from Washington (state)
20th-century American biographers
American women biographers

20th-century American essayists
20th-century American journalists
20th-century American novelists
20th-century American women writers
People from San Juan County, Washington